Antipodia chaostola, the chaostola skipper, is a species of butterfly of the family Hesperiidae. It is found in Australia along the coast of Victoria, New South Wales and Tasmania.

The wingspan is about 30 mm.

The larvae feed on Cyperaceae species, including Gahnia filifolia, Gahnia grandis, Gahnia microstachya, Gahnia radula  and Gahnia sieberiana.

Subspecies
Antipodia chaostola chaostola (New South Wales)
Antipodia chaostola chares (Victoria)
Antipodia chaostola leucophaea (Tasmania)

External links
 Australian Caterpillars

Trapezitinae
Butterflies described in 1888
Butterflies of Australia
Taxa named by Edward Meyrick